Mikk-Mihkel Arro (born 28 March 1984) is an Estonian decathlete.

Achievements

References

1984 births
Living people
Estonian decathletes
Sportspeople from Paide
World Athletics Championships athletes for Estonia